Kabaw Fault is a fault in Myanmar.  It was among those that ruptured during the 1762 Arakan earthquake.

Location
Kabaw Fault lies roughly parallel with the Indo-Burmese border near Mizoram at the foothills of the mountains separating the plains of central Myanmar with the Arakan Mountains, extending due south roughly 300 km.

References

Geology of Myanmar
Seismic faults